Back to Us is the tenth and final studio album by American country music trio Rascal Flatts. It was released on May 19, 2017 through Big Machine Records. The group produced the album themselves, save one track on the deluxe edition, which was produced by Busbee. "Yours If You Want It" was released in January 2017 as the album's lead single, followed by "Back to Us" released the same year. The album serves as a follow-up to 2014's Rewind. Back to Us earned the group their twelfth top-10 album on the Billboard Top Country Albums chart. A deluxe edition of the album also includes the songs "Hands Talk," "Thieves," and "Roller Rink."

This is the group's first album not to be produced by Dann Huff since 2004's Feels Like Today.

Content
Country singer Lauren Alaina features on the track "Are You Happy Now", which was co-written by all three members of Rascal Flatts. "I Know You Won't" was previously recorded by Carrie Underwood on her 2007 album, Carnival Ride.

Singles
The record's lead single, "Yours If You Want It", was released on January 9, 2017. One of the song's writers, Andrew Dorff, died shortly before its release. Another single "Back to Us" was released on August 21, 2017.

Commercial performance
Back to Us debuted at number 11 on the Billboard 200 chart dated June 10, 2017 with 30,000 album equivalent units (of which 25,000 were traditional album sales). The album also entered the Top Country Albums chart the same week at number 2, earning the group their twelfth top-10 album. The album has sold 68,600 copies in the US as of December 2017. The album did reach No. 1 on the Australian country album charts upon release.

Track listing

Notes
 All songs produced by Rascal Flatts except "Hands Talk", produced by busbee.

Personnel 
Adapted from AllMusic

Rascal Flatts
 Jay DeMarcus – acoustic piano, keyboards, synthesizers, Moog bass,  programming, acoustic guitar, electric guitar, banjo, bass guitar, horn arrangements, backing vocals
 Gary LeVox – lead vocals
 Joe Don Rooney – electric guitar, backing vocals

Additional Musicians
 Casey Brown – programming
 Dave Cohen – keyboards
 David Dorn – keyboards
 Rob McNelley – electric guitar
 Danny Rader – acoustic guitar,   bouzouki, mandolin
 Travis Toy – steel guitar
 Dorian Crozier – drums
 Evan Hutchings – drums
 Jim Riley – drums
 Jimmy Bowland – baritone saxophone, tenor saxophone
 Chris McDonald – trombone, horn arrangements
 Jeff Bailey – trumpet
 Steve Patrick – trumpet
 Carole Rabinowitz – cello
 Betsy Lamb – viola 
 Kristin Wilkinson – viola, string arrangements
 David Angell – violin
 Zeneba Bowers – violin
 David Davidson – violin
 Conni Ellisor – violin
 Lauren Alaina – lead and harmony vocals on "Are You Happy Now"

Production 
 Rascal Flatts – producers 
 busbee – producer on "Hands Talk"
 Allison Jones – A&R 
 Derek Bason – engineer, mixing, digital editing 
 Sean Neff – engineer, digital editing
 Justin Niebank – mixing 
 Nick Lane – assistant engineer 
 Bryce Roberts – assistant engineer
 Chris Small – assistant engineer, mix assistant 
 David Huff – digital editing 
 Adam Ayan – mastering 
 Mike "Frog" Griffith – production coordinator 
 Laurel Kittleson – production coordinator 
 Janet Soled – production coordinator 
 Sandi Spika Borchetta – art direction, design 
 Becky Reiser – art direction, design 
 David McClister – photography

Charts

Weekly charts

Year-end charts

Release history

References

2017 albums
Rascal Flatts albums
Big Machine Records albums